I.E.C. (India Education Centre) University  is a private university located at the HIMUDA Education Hub, Solan District, Himachal Pradesh, India. It was established in 2012 by the state legislature.

References

External links 
 IEC University

Education in Solan district
Universities in Himachal Pradesh
Educational institutions established in 2012
2012 establishments in Himachal Pradesh
Private universities in India